CEI may refer to:

Companies and organizations
 Competitive Enterprise Institute, a libertarian think-tank
 Council of Engineering Institutions, later the Engineering Council
 Cycle Engineers' Institute, a screw thread pattern, see British Standard Whitworth
 Episcopal Conference of Italy or

Other uses
 Central European Initiative, a forum of regional cooperation in Central and Eastern Europe
 Chicago and Eastern Illinois Railroad
 Common Electrical I/O, Interoperability Agreements
 Corporate Equality Index of US businesses  regarding LGBT people
 IATA code for Mae Fah Luang – Chiang Rai International Airport, Thailand
 Child Exploitation Imagery, a category of illegal or harmful online content

See also
 Cei (surname)